Cricket is a bat-and-ball sport contested by two teams.

Cricket also commonly refers to:

 Cricket (insect)

Cricket(s) or The Cricket(s) may also refer to:

Film and television
 The Cricket (1917 film), a silent American drama film
 The Cricket (1980 film), an erotic drama film
 Crickets (film), a 2006 Japanese drama film
 Christine Blair or Cricket, a character in The Young and the Restless
 Cricket, a character in To Have and Have Not
 Matthew "Rickety Cricket" Mara, a character in It's Always Sunny in Philadelphia
 Cricket, a character in Big City Greens

Literature
Cricket (magazine), an American literary magazine for children
The Cricket (magazine), a 1960s music magazine
"Chrząszcz"  or "Cricket", a poem by Jan Brzechwa
 Cricket, a character in Fire on the Mountain

Music
 The Crickets, a rock and roll band formed by Buddy Holly
 Cricket (musical), a musical by Andrew Lloyd Webber and Tim Rice
 Crickets (album), by Joe Nichols, 2013
 Cricket (producer), Kosovo-Albanian record producer
 Crickets, a video album by Dredg released alongside their 2002 album El Cielo
 "Crickets", a song by Drop City Yacht Club
 "Cricket", a song by The Kinks from Preservation Act 1

Vehicles
Cricket (1914 automobile), an early American automobile
Plymouth Cricket (disambiguation), two automobiles
Cricket-class coastal destroyer, a 1906 class of Royal Navy ships
HMS Cricket (1915), an Insect-class gunboat
HMS Cricket (shore establishment), Hampshire, 1943-1946

Other uses 
 Cricket (darts), a game using the standard 20-number dartboard
 Cricket (roofing), a ridge structure designed to divert water on a roof
 Cricket (series), a series of cricket video games
 Cricket (warning sound), an audible warning in the cockpits of commercial aircraft
 Cricket dolls, a talking doll released by Playmates Toys in 1986
 Cricket, North Carolina
 Cricket Wireless, wireless service provider, a subsidiary of AT&T Inc.
 Programmable Cricket, robotic toys
 Clicker or cricket, a noisemaker
 Cricket, a variation of the float breakdancing technique
 Cricket, a data collection software on top of RRDtool

See also 
Colomban Cri-cri, a light plane
 Cricket House and Cricket Park, in Cricket St Thomas, England
HMS Cricket, a list of Royal Navy ships
 Shturcite, a Bulgarian band, translated as The Crickets, or an album by them
 Tettigoniidae, known as katydids or bush-crickets
 Cricut, a cutting machine for home crafters